is a railway station in the town of Matsushima, Miyagi, Japan, operated by East Japan Railway Company (JR East). This station is about 1 km from Takagimachi Station and about 2 km away from Matsushima-Kaigan Station on the Senseki Line. Of the three, Matsushima-Kaigan is the station closest to most tourist destinations.

Lines
Matsushima Station is served by the Tōhoku Main Line, and is located 375.2 rail kilometers from the official starting point of the line at Tokyo Station.

Station layout
The station has one side platform and one island platform connected by a footbridge. The station has a "Midori no Madoguchi" staffed ticket office.

Platforms

History
The station was renamed to its present name on July 1, 1962. The station was absorbed into the JR East network upon the privatization of the Japanese National Railways (JNR) on April 1, 1987. A new station building was completed in March 2010.

Passenger statistics
In fiscal 2018, the station was used by an average of 829 passengers daily (boarding passengers only).

Surrounding area
Matsushima Town Hall
Matsushima Post Office

See also
 List of Railway Stations in Japan

References

External links

  

Railway stations in Miyagi Prefecture
Tōhoku Main Line
Railway stations in Japan opened in 1956
Matsushima, Miyagi
Stations of East Japan Railway Company